Lydia Benecke (born in 1982 as E. C. Wawrzyniak) is a German criminal psychologist and writer of popular science non-fiction.

Life
Benecke was born in Bytom, Poland and left for Germany at the age of 4 with her mother. She grew up in Bottrop and developed her interest in criminal cases from a young age. After finishing school at the Janusz-Korczak-Gesamtschule in Bottrop, she studied Psychology, Psychopathology and Forensic science at the Ruhr University Bochum. She was married to Mark Benecke. She lives in Cologne and is active in the German skeptical organization GWUP.

Career

Psychologist
Benecke attended an adult education course in psychology as a teenager. After a school internship she worked as a freelancer for a psychological psychotherapist during her extracurricular time.

Since 2008 she has been working therapeutically in a social therapy institution with sexual and violent offenders 

Between 2009 and 2013 she worked as a psychological consultant in criminal cases and in public relations for her then husband's company, the criminal biologist Mark Benecke Nowadays, she works as an independent criminal psychologist with an office in Cologne in the fields of consulting and education. Her main areas of work are paraphilia, personality disorders (especially psychopathy, dissocial personality disorders and borderline personality disorders), Psychological trauma, superstitious beliefs, subcultures (especially BDSM scene, Dark culture, Goth subculture, sects and vampire subculture).

Author
After completing her studies in psychology, she co-authored several of Mark Benecke's books between 2009 and 2011, of which she also edited "The Benecke Universe".

Mark Benecke and others commissioned her to write "Aus der Dunkelkammer des Bösen" to create a comprehensive psychological profile for the Colombian serial killer Luis Alfredo Garavito Cubillos. The book was published 2011, and achieved high rankings on the Spiegel bestseller list. She has been a regular columnist for the German-language BDSM magazine "Schlagzeilen" since 2010.

In her column "Psychokiste" she deals with various questions on the subject of BDSM from a psychological point of view.

In 2013, she published a psychological profile of the historical serial killer and cannibal Karl Denke. Her book "Auf dünnem Eis" was published in October 2013. It entered the Spiegel bestseller list at number 13 in November 2013.

Her next book "Sadisten" was published on 12 February 2015. "Tödliche Liebe – Geschichten aus dem wahren Leben" also achieved a place in the bestseller lists, as did "Psychopathinnen. Die Psychologie des weiblichen Bösen" (Female psychopaths. The psychology of female evil) in 2018.

Volunteer activities
Lydia Benecke has been a member of the GWUP since her time as a student. In this context, she deals with the psychological examination of the vampire motif, the vampire subculture, superstition and homeopathy. In 2012, after writing a psychological statement on the indexing of a BDSM forum by the youth protection, she became the youth protection commissioner of the German BDSM youth organisation SMJG. She is part of an international Working Group on Human Asphyxia set up by the Canadian forensic scientist Anny Sauvageau. She participated in the evaluation of a series of video recordings recording  fatal autoerotic accidents and suicides

She was involved in suicide and depression prevention in the non-profit association for the prevention of suicide and education about depression and suicide in adolescents and young people Freunde fürs Leben e. V.

Media
Since 2009 she has appeared as a psychological expert in various television programmes, including TV total, Explosiv - Das Magazin, Markus Lanz, Bambule, Inka!, Sat.1 breakfast television, the special programme XY - gelöst and the ZDF documentary Dracula lebt!

She also works as an expert for radio, podcast productions, print media and electronic magazines. She has spoken from a psychological point of view on topics such as psychopathy, the Zodiac killer, sexually motivated homicides,  Letter bomb assassins, the 2011 Norway attacks, Vampires, BDSM, sadomasochism in Germany, skepticism, criminal psychology, doomsday myths and end-time sects.

In 2013 she was in Sat.1-Production "Stalker – Caught in the act" as psychologist responsible for the assessment of the perpetrators.
She also explains criminal cases in German TV show Aktenzeichen XY … ungelöst. She also works with Anwälte der Toten and Erbarmungslos", two other TV shows. She also appears in German shows Aktenzeichen XY...ungelöst and Anwälte der Toten as well as Erbarmungslos.

Publications
 Vampire unter uns! Teil 1: Rh. pos. (with Mark Benecke, Kathrin Sonntag, Nastassia Palanetskaya), Edition Roter Drache, Rudolstadt 2009, .
 Vampire unter uns! Teil 2: Rh. neg. (with Mark Benecke), Edition Roter Drache, Rudolstadt 2010, 
 Das Benecke-Universum (with Mark Benecke), Militzke, Leipzig 2011, .
 Aus der Dunkelkammer des Bösen. Neue Berichte vom bekanntesten Kriminalbiologen der Welt (with Mark Benecke), Lübbe, Köln 2011, L. Benecke: pp. 60–68/ 71–259 / 292–297 / 327–330 / 357–364 / 388–390.
 Auf dünnem Eis. Die Psychologie des Bösen, Lübbe, Köln 2013, ; Taschenbuch ebd. 2016, .
 Historische Serienmörder III: Karl Denke – Der Kannibale von Münsterberg: Ein deutscher Serienmörder" by Armin Rütters, Kirchschlager 2013, L. Benecke: pp. 73–86, .
 Sadisten. Tödliche Liebe – Geschichten aus dem wahren Leben. Lübbe, Köln 2015, .
 Wie meine Internet-Liebe zum Albtraum wurde: Das Phänomen Realfakes" by Victoria Schwartz, Blanvalet 2015, L. Benecke: pp. 256–266, .
 Ein multidimensionales psychologisches Modell zur Unterscheidung zwischen inklinierendem und periculärem sexuellen Sadismus, in: Schriftenreihe der Gesellschaft für Kriminologie, Polizei und Recht e.V. : Band 3 / II. Sammelband, Verlag für Polizeiwissenschaft, Frankfurt am Main 2015. L. Benecke: pp. 32–65. .
 Die 120 Tage von Sodom 2.0: Neu übersetzt von Curt Moreck, by Marquis de Sade with Frank Schulten, L. Benecke: pp. 6–24), 2016, .
 Psychopathinnen. Die Psychologie des weiblichen Bösen. Lübbe, Köln 2018, .
 Ein multidimensionales psychologisches Modell zur Unterscheidung zwischen inklinierendem und periculärem sexuellen Sadismus, In: Destruktive Sexualität. Therapie und Risk-Assessment in der Forensischen Psychiatrie. Berlin 2018, L. Benecke: pp. 11– I26, .

References

External links
 Own Website
 GWUP page

Living people
1982 births
German psychologists
German women psychologists
Criminal psychologists
German non-fiction writers
German women writers
People from Bytom